Vella is a surname. Notable people with the surname include:

Surnames
Adam Vella (sport shooter), (born 1971), Australian shooter and Olympic medalist
Alex Vella (born 1953), Maltese-Australian businessman and former boxer
Christina Vella (1942–2017), American historian of modern Europe
Corissa Vella (born 1988), Maltese footballer
Daniel J. Vella (born 1955), Canadian racehorse trainer
George William Vella (born 1942), Maltese politician
Gianni Vella (1885–1977), Maltese artist
John Vella (born 1950), American football player
 (1942–2018), Maltese composer
Karmenu Vella (born 1950), Maltese politician 
Lolly Vella (1933–2012), Australian soccer player
Luciano Vella (born 1981), Argentine soccer player
Marjanu Vella (1927–1988), Maltese poet
Michael Vella (born 1980), Australian professional rugby league player
Philip Vella, Maltese composer
Silvio Vella (born 1967), Canadian soccer player 
Simon Vella (born 1979), Maltese international football player
Vinny Vella (1947–2019), American actor and comedian

People with first name
Vella Pillay (1923–2004), South African economist and political activist

Maltese-language surnames